Jeelani Bano is an Indian writer of Urdu literature. She was honored by the Government of India, in 2001, with the fourth highest Indian civilian award of Padma Shri.

Biography
Jeelani Bano was born on 14 July 1936 in Badayun, in the Indian state of Uttar Pradesh to Hairat Badayuni, a known Urdu poet. After her schooling, she enrolled for intermediate course when she married Anwar Moazzam, a poet of repute and a former head of the Department of Islamic Studies at the Osmania University and shifted to Hyderabad. She continued her education to secure a master's degree (MA) in Urdu.

She started writing at an early age, reported to be at the age of eight, and her first story, Ek Nazar Idhar Bhi (A Glance Hither), was published in 1952. She is credited with 22 books comprising anthologies starting with Roshni ke Minar and novels beginning with Aiwaan-e-ghazal. Her list of books include an autobiography, Afzane and a collection of her correspondence with other writers, Door ki Aawaazen. One of her stories, Narsayya Ki Bavdi, has been made into a 2009 feature film, Well Done Abba by the renowned filmmaker, Shyam Benegal. Many of her books have been translated into other languages.

Bano received the Andhra Pradesh Sahitya Akademi Award in 1960, followed by the Soviet Land Nehru Award in 1985. She received the Qaumi Haali Award from the Haryana Urdu Academy in 1989. The Government of India honoured her with the civilian award of Padma Shri in 2001.

Jeelani Bano, a former Chairperson of the non governmental organization for women's rights, Asmita, lives in Banjara Hills, Hyderabad. She is also associated with Youth for Action of which she is a former chairperson, Child and Women Human Rights, a forum of the International Human Rights Association of India as its principal advisor and maintains associations with radio and television.

Selected works

 Aiwaan-e-ghazal (novel)
 Baarish-e-Sang (novel)
 Nirvaan (novel)
 Jugnu aur Sitare (novel)
 Naghme Ka Safar (novel)
 Roshni ke Minar (short story anthology)
 Paraya Ghar (short story anthology)
 Raat ke Musafir (short story anthology)
 Raz ka Qissa (short story anthology)
 Yeh koun Hansa (short story anthology)
 Tiryaaq (short story anthology)
 Nayee Aurat (short story anthology)
 Sach ke siva (short story anthology)
 Baat Phoolon ki (short story anthology)
 Dus Pratinidhi Kahaniyan (short story anthology)
 Kun (short story anthology)
 Addu (short story anthology)

See also
 Urdu literature
 Well Done Abba

References

Further reading

External links
 

1936 births
Living people
Recipients of the Padma Shri in literature & education
Indian women poets
Urdu-language writers
Urdu-language poets from India
20th-century Indian short story writers
20th-century Indian Muslims
20th-century Indian poets
People from Budaun
Indian women novelists
Indian women short story writers
20th-century Indian women writers
20th-century Indian novelists
Writers from Uttar Pradesh
Women writers from Uttar Pradesh
Novelists from Uttar Pradesh
Poets from Uttar Pradesh